Mount Cummings is a mountain at the eastern end of Galan Ridge in the Dana Mountains of Palmer Land. It was first mapped by the joint Ronne Antarctic Research Expedition – Falkland Islands Dependencies Survey party, 1947–48, and mapped in greater detail by the United States Geological Survey from ground surveys and from U.S. Navy air photos, 1961–67. It was named by the Advisory Committee on Antarctic Names for Jack W. Cummings, a radioman with the Palmer Station winter party in 1965.

References
 

Mountains of Palmer Land